Marc Bartra Aregall (born 15 January 1991) is a Spanish professional footballer who plays as a centre-back for Süper Lig club Trabzonspor and the Catalonia national team.

He started his career at Barcelona, where he played 103 professional games and scored six goals across seven seasons, winning 13 honours including five La Liga titles. In 2016, he joined Borussia Dortmund for €8 million, where he lifted the DFB-Pokal in his first season. He returned to Spain in 2018, playing 146 total games for Betis and winning the Copa del Rey in 2022.

Bartra won the 2013 European Championships with Spain's under-21 team. He made his senior debut in 2013, and was selected for Euro 2016.

Club career

Barcelona
Born in Sant Jaume dels Domenys, Tarragona, Catalonia, Bartra joined RCD Espanyol as a child before moving to FC Barcelona's youth system, La Masia, at age 11. After progressing through its ranks, he was promoted to the B side in 2009.

Bartra made his first-team debut on 14 February 2010, coming on as a substitute for Jeffrén Suárez for the final 30 minutes of a 2–1 loss to Atlético Madrid at the Vicente Calderón Stadium. He started his first La Liga game one year and three months later, playing the entire 0–0 home draw against Deportivo de La Coruña, and scored his first goal on 21 May 2011 to help them come from behind to win it 3–1 at Málaga CF in the season's last round.

In the 2012–13 campaign, Bartra joined the first team squad permanently, but manager Tito Vilanova tended to field Javier Mascherano, Alex Song and Adriano ahead of him, and played only 16 games in all competitions. He signed a new three-year contract in March 2014.

On 16 April 2014, in the final of the Copa del Rey against Real Madrid, with five minutes remaining, Gareth Bale outsprinted Bartra from the halfway line – with the former running off the field at one point – before scoring the 2–1 winner. He himself had levelled the score midway into the second half, from a Xavi corner kick. He remained a third or fourth choice under new manager Luis Enrique, making 25 appearances and scoring once as the team won the treble in 2014–15.

Borussia Dortmund
On 3 June 2016, Bartra was sold to German club Borussia Dortmund for an estimated fee of €8 million, signing a four-year deal. He made his competitive debut on 14 August, playing the entire 2–0 loss against FC Bayern Munich for the DFL-Supercup, and a month later scored his first goal in a 6–0 win at Legia Warsaw for the group stage of the UEFA Champions League.

On 11 April 2017, when Dortmund was heading to Westfalenstadion for their Champions League quarter-final tie against AS Monaco FC, the team bus was hit by three explosions. Bartra, who broke the radial bone in his arm and had debris lodged in his hand in the bombing, underwent an operation the following day, when the Germans played the rescheduled game and lost 2–3; he later described the event as the "longest and hardest 15 minutes of my life", and returned to training 29 days after his surgery.

Bartra's first match after returning took place on 20 May 2017, and he played the entire 4–3 home win over SV Werder Bremen– he had also been an unused substitute in the previous fixture against FC Augsburg. One week later, he helped to the conquest of the DFB-Pokal after starting in the 2–1 defeat of Eintracht Frankfurt in Berlin.

Betis
On 30 January 2018, Bartra completed his transfer to Real Betis on a five-and-a-half-year contract. He scored his first goal for his new team on 12 May, putting the hosts ahead in an eventual 2–2 derby home draw against Sevilla FC.

From December 2020 to the following March, Bartra was sidelined with tendonitis in his Achilles and a gallbladder issue, leading to significant weight loss. He played the full 120 minutes of the 2022 Copa del Rey Final on 23 April, a penalty shootout win over Valencia CF.

Trabzonspor
On 14 August 2022, Bartra signed for Trabzonspor in the Turkish Süper Lig for €1.25 million. He made his debut two days later in the Champions League play-off first leg away to F.C. Copenhagen, as a substitute in a 2–1 loss; his first goal on 18 September came in added time to win 3–2 at home to Gaziantep FK. On 28 December, he equalised away to Fatih Karagümrük S.K. but was sent off with a straight red card before half time in a 4–1 defeat.

International career

Bartra won 37 caps for Spain at youth level all categories comprised, including 16 for the under-21s. He made his debut for the full side on 16 November 2013, playing the entire 2–1 friendly win in Equatorial Guinea. This game was later annulled by FIFA as they had not been notified early enough that the referee would be from Equatorial Guinea, and his first valid appearance took place on 8 September 2014 as he came on as a 68th-minute substitute for Sergio Ramos in a 5–1 home triumph against Macedonia for the UEFA Euro 2016 qualifiers.

On 17 May 2016, Bartra was named in Vicente del Bosque's provisional squad of 25 for the finals in France, and he also made it to the final list of 23. As the tournament ended at the round of 16, he was an unused member.

Bartra scored his first goal for his country on 11 October 2018, contributing to a 4–1 friendly defeat of Wales at the Millennium Stadium.

Style of play
Bartra is known for his pace and passing. He is mentally strong, is skilled in the air and is able to play as a right-back, where he can cut in and assist.

Personal life
Bartra's fraternal twin brother, Èric, also came through La Masia. He started a relationship with Grand Prix motorcycle racing journalist Melissa Jiménez in February 2014, and welcomed daughter Gala on 18 August of the following year.

Career statistics

Club

International

Scores and results list Spain's goal tally first, score column indicates score after each Bartra goal.

Honours
Barcelona
La Liga: 2009–10, 2010–11, 2012–13, 2014–15, 2015–16
Copa del Rey: 2011–12, 2014–15, 2015–16
Supercopa de España: 2013
UEFA Champions League: 2010–11, 2014–15
UEFA Super Cup: 2015
FIFA Club World Cup: 2015

Borussia Dortmund
DFB-Pokal: 2016–17

Betis
Copa del Rey: 2021–22

Spain U19
UEFA European Under-19 Championship runner-up: 2010

Spain U21
UEFA European Under-21 Championship: 2013

Individual
UEFA European Under-21 Championship Team of the Tournament: 2013
UEFA La Liga Team of The Season: 2017–18

References

External links

1991 births
Living people
People from Baix Penedès
Spanish twins
Twin sportspeople
Sportspeople from the Province of Tarragona
Spanish footballers
Footballers from Catalonia
Association football defenders
La Liga players
Segunda División players
Segunda División B players
FC Barcelona Atlètic players
FC Barcelona players
Real Betis players
Bundesliga players
Borussia Dortmund players
Süper Lig players
Trabzonspor footballers
UEFA Champions League winning players
Spain youth international footballers
Spain under-21 international footballers
Spain international footballers
UEFA Euro 2016 players
Catalonia international footballers
Spanish expatriate footballers
Expatriate footballers in Germany
Expatriate footballers in Turkey
Spanish expatriate sportspeople in Germany
Spanish expatriate sportspeople in Turkey
Survivors of terrorist attacks